Maoha Union is a union parishad under Gouripur Upazila of Mymensingh District in the division of Mymensingh, Bangladesh.

References

Unions of Gouripur Upazila
Unions of Mymensingh District
Unions of Mymensingh Division